The 45th G7 summit was held on 24–26 August 2019, in Biarritz, France. In March 2014, the G7 declared that a meaningful discussion was currently not possible with Russia in the context of the G8. Since then, meetings have continued within the G7 process. However, according to a senior Trump administration official, Donald Trump and Emmanuel Macron had agreed that Russia should be invited to the next G7 Summit to be held in 2020.

Concluding communique
Five points were agreed at the issue of the summit, about:
the World Trade Organization, "with regard to intellectual property protection, to settle disputes more swiftly and to eliminate unfair trade practices"
the "G7 commits to reaching an agreement in 2020 to simplify regulatory barriers and modernize international taxation within the framework of the OECD"
the G7 shares objectives on Iran: "to ensure that Iran never acquires nuclear weapons and to foster peace and stability in the region."
on Libya: "We support a truce in Libya that will lead to a long-term ceasefire. We believe that only a political solution can ensure Libya’s stability. We call for a well-prepared international conference to bring together all the stakeholders and regional actors relevant to this conflict. We support in this regard the work of the United Nations and the African Union to set up an inter-Libyan conference."
in an opaque reference to the Russian military intervention in Ukraine (2014–present), "France and Germany will organize a Normandy format summit in the coming weeks to achieve tangible results."
in light of the 2019–20 Hong Kong protests, "The G7 reaffirms the existence and the importance of the 1984 Sino-British agreement on Hong Kong and calls for avoiding violence."

Final press conference
In the final press conference, UK Prime Minister Johnson said "Iran should never be allowed to get a nuclear weapon", and US President Trump spoke about Iran in a joint news conference with French President Macron. Whereas the European powers sought to appease Iran, Trump said in apparent reference to combative rhetoric by the Iranian government about its ability to attack US interests:

Host 
France, as the host of the 2019 G7 summit, held it at the Hôtel du Palais in Biarritz.

Leaders at the summit
Attendees included leaders of the G7 member states plus representatives of the European Union. The President of the European Commission has been a permanently participant at all meetings since 1981, but current President Jean-Claude Juncker did not attend due to medical problems. The President of the European Council has been the EU's co-representative since the 36th G8 summit hosted by Canada in 2010.

The 45th G7 summit was the first summit for British Prime Minister Boris Johnson and the last summit for European Council President Donald Tusk. It was also the final summit for Japanese Prime Minister Shinzō Abe, U.S. President Donald Trump and Italian Prime Minister Giuseppe Conte, as the planned 46th G7 summit was cancelled due to the COVID-19 pandemic. Abe handed over the power to Yoshihide Suga on September 16, 2020; Trump handed over the power to Joe Biden on January 20, 2021; and Conte handed over the power to Mario Draghi on February 13, 2021.

For this summit, Japanese Prime Minister Shinzō Abe had prepared to discuss about the situation in Hong Kong, where China is imposing a new security law.

The President of France, Emmanuel Macron, invited the Prime Minister of Australia Scott Morrison, the Prime Minister of Spain Pedro Sánchez, and the Prime Minister of India Narendra Modi to attend the outreach session of the summit as special invitees.

Participants

Gallery of participating leaders

Invited guests

Presidents and Heads of government
The following leaders were invited to the Outreach Session of the G7 Summit.

Heads of international organisations

Participation

The Prime Ministers of Italy and Spain, Conte and Sanchez, are taking part in the summit as caretaker Prime Ministers. Jean-Claude Juncker of the European Commission did not attend due to bad health.

In a surprise move, Emmanuel Macron invited to attend on the margins Javad Zarif, who flew in on an Iranian government plane. Macron, who "attempted a high-risk diplomatic gambit", thought that the Foreign Minister of Iran might be able to defuse the tense situation over the Iranian nuclear programme in spite of the recent uptick in tensions between the Islamic Republic and the United States and Britain. A highly placed French political source said that

Topics

Topics discussed included global trade, global warming, and taxing technology companies. European Council President Donald Tusk said leaders at the summit should discuss the Iran nuclear deal, which was at risk due to the U.S. government's decision to pull out.

On August 23, President Emmanuel Macron urged the G7 to lead the summit discussions with the 2019 Amazon wildfires, which he described as an "international crisis". He said, "Our house is burning. Literally", adding that the Amazon rainforest produces 20% of the world's oxygen. U.S. President Donald Trump offered to take the position of the Brazilian government to the meeting, and said that the U.S. government did not agree to discuss the issue without Brazil's presence. The United Kingdom, Italy, Japan, Spain and Chile also support Brazil. During the meeting, it was reported that there were "sharp differences" among the participants.

On a request from the President Emmanuel Macron, François-Henri Pinault, Chairman and CEO of the luxury group Kering, presented the Fashion Pact during the summit, an initiative signed by 32 fashion firms committing to concrete measures to reduce their environmental impact. By 2020, 60 firms had joined the Fashion Pact.

Protests and counter-summit

More than 13000 policemen are required for security. The French government wishes to avoid anti-globalization movements. The protesters of the Summit had several motivations, such as anti extractivism and anti-globalization. Protesters included human rights groups and climate change activists.

A number of small French and Basque organizations joined to organize a "Contre G7" summit, over the same days as the G7, in the south of the French Basque country.

References

External links

G7 summit
G7 summit
G7 summit
G7 summit,45
Biarritz
G7 summit
G7 summit,45
2019